BBC Radio 1 Live in Concert is a live album by the English band New Order. The album is an edited recording  of the band's headline performance at Glastonbury CND Festival '87. It was first released as a live album in 1992. The live album charted at number thirty-three on the UK Albums Chart and was certified as Silver (60,000 units sold) by the BPI. The live album received mixed reviews and was first released as an LP, CD and Cassette in February 1992. The live album was released in June 2000 with new artwork by The Peter Saville Studio with photography by Jon Wozencroft. The original sleeve was designed by Mental Block.

The live album replicates the original broadcast recording by omitting four songs from the performance. "Elegia", "Ceremony", "Sub-culture" and "Sunrise" were also performed. The actual set-list was as follows: "Elegia", "Touched by the Hand of God", "Temptation", "True Faith", "Your Silent Face", "Every Little Counts", "Ceremony", "Bizarre Love Triangle", "Sub-culture", "Sunrise", "The Perfect Kiss", "Age of Consent" and "Sister Ray". The recording of "Elegia" was later included on the live disc of New Order's 2002 boxset Retro.

The set included the first public appearance of the song "True Faith", which would be released as a single the following month and go on to become one of the group's biggest and most enduringly popular hits.

Track listing

Personnel
New Order
Gillian Gilbert - Keyboards, guitar
Peter Hook - Bass
Stephen Morris - Drums, keyboards
Bernard Sumner - Vocals, Guitar

Additional personnel
Pete Ritzema - Producer
Mental Block - Design (1992 release)
The Peter Saville Studio - Design (2000 release)
Jon Wozencroft - Photography
Paul Lester - Liner Notes (2000 release)

Chart positions

References

New Order (band) live albums
BBC Radio recordings
1992 live albums
Strange Fruit Records live albums